Châtillon-sur-Chalaronne (literally Châtillon on Chalaronne) is a commune in the Ain department in eastern France.

History

The town takes its name from a castle built around 1000 AD. It was formerly named Châtillon-les-Dombes.

Geography
The Chalaronne flows northwest through the commune and crosses the town.

Population

Twin towns
Wächtersbach (Germany)
Colceag (Romania)

Personalities
Saint Vincent de Paul: was curate of Châtillon and founded the Brotherhood of Charity (1617)
Philibert Commerson: botanist, born in Châtillon in 1727

See also
Dombes
Communes of the Ain department

References

External links

Châtillon-sur-Chalaronne official website
La Dombes and Châtillon-sur-Chalaronne
Images by Paul C. Maurice

Communes of Ain
Dombes
Ain communes articles needing translation from French Wikipedia